Michael Okechukwu Chinda is a Member of the House of Assembly representing the Obio-Akpor II assembly constituency in the Rivers State House of Assembly, Nigeria. He is a member of the Rivers State People's Democratic Party. He was first elected in 2011, and in a March 2016 election rerun was reelected to the Assembly.

References

Living people
Rivers State Peoples Democratic Party politicians
Members of the Rivers State House of Assembly
People from Obio-Akpor
Year of birth missing (living people)